The 2015 Metro Atlantic Athletic Conference men's soccer tournament was the 23rd edition of the tournament. It determined the Metro Atlantic Athletic Conference's automatic berth into the 2015 NCAA Division I Men's Soccer Championship.

The Rider Broncs won the tournament, besting the Monmouth Hawks in the championship match.

Qualification 

All teams in the Metro Atlantic Athletic Conference qualified for the tournament.

Bracket

Schedule

First round

Quarterfinals

Semifinals

Final

Statistical leaders

Top goalscorers

See also 
 Metro Atlantic Athletic Conference
 2015 Metro Atlantic Athletic Conference men's soccer season
 2015 NCAA Division I men's soccer season
 2015 NCAA Division I Men's Soccer Championship

References 

tournament 2015
Metro Atlantic Athletic Conference Men's Soccer
MAAC Men's Soccer Tournament